The Amazons are a British rock band from Reading, Berkshire, formed in 2014. The band's debut album rose to number 8 on the UK Albums Chart. They have also been named a band to listen to in 2017 by NME, The Independent and BBC Radio 1.

The band were included in MTV's and the BBC's Brand New for 2017 and Sound of 2017 longlists respectively. AllMusic described them as an indie rock group known for crafting catchy and melodic arena rock anthems suitable for singing along.

Band members
 Matt Thomson – vocals, guitar (2014-present)
 Chris Alderton – guitar (2014-present)
 Elliot Briggs – bass (2014-present)

Past members
 Joe Emmett – drums (2014-2022)

Discography

Studio albums

Live albums

Extended plays

Singles

Promotional singles

Music videos

Awards and nominations

References

External links

Official web site

Interviews

The Amazons on their “spiritual home

English rock music groups